Hippocampus dahli (lowcrown seahorse) is a fish species of the family Syngnathidae. Little is known of its feeding habits, but it is likely to feed on small crustaceans such as copepods, amphipods, and gammarid, caprellid, and caridean shrimps, similar to other seahorses. This species is ovoviviparous, with males carrying eggs in a brood pouch before giving birth to live young. This species is not listed in FishBase and many authorities treat it as a synonym of Hippocampus trimaculatus.

Identifying features

Individuals usually have relatively smooth bodies, with low, reduced spines and a low coronet. This species displays sexually dimorphic colour patterns. Females are mostly pale brown to black, often with black scribble marks forming lined, zebra-like patterns. Males are usually dark brown to black with black scribbles.

References

Further reading
WoRMS

Atlas of Living Australia

iSeahorse

IUCN Seahorse, Pipefish & Stickleback Specialist Group

dahli
Taxa named by James Douglas Ogilby
Fish described in 1908
Marine fish